Adrian Grant is a writer and theatrical producer best known for creating the hit West End stage show, Thriller – Live.

Biography 

Adrian was privileged with great access to Michael Jackson for over 20-years  leading to the publication of three books, including the best-selling chronology Michael Jackson - The Visual Documentary.

As a theatrical producer Adrian also created The Aretha Franklin Songbook  and Respect La Diva.

In October 2017 Adrian received the Image Award at the Black British Business Awards  for setting a record of excellence and making a lasting, significant and positive contribution to the standing of people of African and Caribbean heritage in Britain.

In November 2018 Adrian launched the Visionary Honours  celebrating social impact in culture, media and entertainment.

In October 2020 Adrian received the Best Producer Award for Thriller – Live at the Black British Theatre Awards.

References

External links 
 https://www.baronetentertainment.com/adrian-grant
 https://thrillerlive.com/cast/adrian-grant/
 http://www.thrillerlive.com
 https://www.amazon.co.uk/Adrian-Grant/e/B001KE3ZD4/ref=ntt_athr_dp_pel_pop_1
 https://visionaryarts.org.uk/

Living people
Year of birth missing (living people)
British male writers
British theatre managers and producers